Splendrillia mikrokamelos is a species of sea snail, a marine gastropod mollusk in the family Drilliidae.

Description
The small claviform shell has a length of 6.2 mm, its diameter 2.6 mm.  The vitreous protoconch is very small and consists of 1½ whorl (breadth ca 0,75 mm), the teleoconch contains 5 whorls.. The axial ribs are strong (with 9 ribs on the penultimate whorl). The body whorl has an inverted cone shape and its dorsum is prominently humped. The short siphonal canal is narrow and twisted slightly to the right. The aperture is narrowly pear-shaped. The outer lip is somewhat flattened in the middle. The columella is almost straight.

Distribution
This marine species occurs off the upper continental slope of Transkei, South Africa.

References

  Tucker, J.K. 2004 Catalog of recent and fossil turrids (Mollusca: Gastropoda). Zootaxa 682:1–1295.

Endemic fauna of South Africa
mikrokamelos
Gastropods described in 1988